Iuliana Paleu (born September 30, 1990 in Bicaz, Neamț) is a Romanian sprint canoeist. Paleu is a member of the canoe and kayak team for CS Dinamo București, and is coached and trained by Iuan Sipos.

Paleu represented Romania at the 2012 Summer Olympics in London, where she competed in the women's K-2 500 metres. Paleu and her partner Irina Lauric paddled to an eighth-place finish and sixteenth overall in the B-final.  They were nineteen hundredths of a second (0.19) behind the Russian pair of Natalia Lobova and Vera Sobetova, who posted a time of 1:52.468.

References

External links
NBC Olympics Profile

1990 births
Romanian female canoeists
Living people
Olympic canoeists of Romania
Canoeists at the 2012 Summer Olympics
People from Neamț County